Brian McBride is an American soccer player.

Brian McBride may also refer to:
Brian McBride (musician) (born 1970), member of ambient music duo Stars of the Lid
Brian McBride (businessman) (born 1955), president of the Confederation of British Industry

See also
Bryan McBride (born 1991), American track and field athlete